Coalition for a Solidary Europe (CEUS) is an electoral list of regionalist parties formed to contest the 2019 European Parliament election in Spain. The list is the de facto successor of the Coalition for Europe of 2014, and is formed by the Basque Nationalist Party (EAJ/PNV), Canarian Coalition–Canarian Nationalist Party (CCa–PNC), Commitment to Galicia (CxG), Proposal for the Isles (El Pi), Valencian Democrats (DV) and Yes to the Future (GBai).

Composition

Electoral performance

European Parliament

References

Centrist parties in Spain
Regionalist parties in Spain
Nationalist parties in Spain
2019 establishments in Spain
Political parties established in 2019